Dolichodynerus is a nearctic genus of potter wasps. It contains the following species:

 Dolichodynerus tanynotus (Cameron, 1909)
 Dolichodynerus turgiceps (Bohart, 1939)
 Dolichodynerus vandykei Bohart, 1950

References

Biological pest control wasps
Potter wasps